The Westman Journal, previously known as the Wheat City Journal,  was a weekly community newspaper printed in Brandon, Manitoba. Its founder and former publisher is Bruce Penton. It provided Brandon-based, people-oriented news and sports.

Last Publisher: Nancy Johnson
Last Editor: Brandi Pollock

The paper's first issue was released on April 25, 2002, under the name Wheat City Journal. In 2004, the Wheat City Journal was purchased by Glacier Media. In 2009, the paper's name was changed to the Westman Journal. It ceased its operations on April 29, 2019.

References

External links
Westman Journal

Weekly newspapers published in Manitoba
Mass media in Brandon, Manitoba
Publications established in 2002
2002 establishments in Manitoba
Defunct newspapers published in Manitoba
Defunct weekly newspapers
Publications disestablished in 2019